Retinoid-inducible serine carboxypeptidase is an enzyme that in humans is encoded by the SCPEP1 gene.

References

Further reading